Loti Celina (born 5 June 2000) is a professional footballer who plays as a right-back for Albanian club Partizani Tirana. Born in Norway, he has represented Kosovo at youth level.

Club career

Early career
Celina was born and raised in Fjell, Drammen in a family of footballers where his two older brothers, Behadil and Bersant were professional footballers, the latter is one of the most important players in Kosovo national team. He at the age of 11 started playing football in Strømsgodset with whom he played in all youth teams, including senior level with which debut on 26 April 2017 in the 2017 Norwegian Cup first round against Åssiden after coming on as a substitute at 56th minute in place of Mounir Hamoud.

During the second half of the 2019–20 season, Celina was on long trial at Swansea City U23, where on 3 February 2020, he played in a league match which ended in a 0–4 home defeat against Newcastle United U23 after being named in the starting line-up, but unfortunately this test failed even though it was warned that they would sign contract.

Partizani Tirana
On 31 January 2021, Celina signed his first professional contract with Kategoria Superiore side Partizani Tirana after agreeing to a two-and-a-half years deal. On 26 May 2021, he made his debut in a 2–4 away win against Bylis after coming on as a substitute at 79th minute in place of Eraldo Çinari.

International career
On 8 February 2017, Celina received a call-up from Kosovo U19 for a five-day training camp in Ulcinj. On 1 October 2017, he was named as part of the Kosovo U19 squad for 2018 UEFA European Under-19 Championship qualifications. Two days later, Celina made his debut with Kosovo U19 in a match against Austria U19 after being named in the starting line-up.

Career statistics

Club

References

External links

2000 births
Living people
Sportspeople from Drammen
Kosovan footballers
Kosovo youth international footballers
Norwegian footballers
Kosovan expatriate footballers
Kosovan expatriate sportspeople in England
Kosovan expatriate sportspeople in Albania
Norwegian people of Kosovan descent
Norwegian people of Albanian descent
Norwegian expatriate footballers
Norwegian expatriate sportspeople in England
Norwegian expatriates in Albania
Association football fullbacks
Norwegian Third Division players
Norwegian Second Division players
Strømsgodset Toppfotball players
Kategoria Superiore players
FK Partizani Tirana players